Caryocolum longiusculum is a moth of the family Gelechiidae. It is found in Afghanistan.

The length of the forewings is about 6.5 mm for males and 6 mm for females. The forewings are light brown, speckled with whitish and orange-brown. There are dark brown markings. Adults have been recorded on wing in July.

References

Moths described in 1988
longiusculum
Moths of Asia